The original Tiger Park was a softball stadium located on the campus of Louisiana State University in Baton Rouge, Louisiana.  The stadium was located on the southwest corner of West Chimes Street and Alaska Street.  It served as the home field of the LSU Tigers softball team from 1997 to 2008.  The official capacity of the stadium was 1,000 people, however, the stadium held more than that when important rivals came to town or during post-season tournaments.  The largest crowd to see a game in the original Tiger Park was on April 28, 2007, when LSU hosted Tennessee before a crowd of 2,326.

The stadium was opened prior to the 1997 college softball season and played host to four NCAA regionals in 1999, 2000, 2001, and 2006 and hosted the 2008 SEC softball tournament.  The 2008 season was the twelfth and final season in the original Tiger Park. LSU closed out the original Tiger Park with a home record of 331–51, including 140–34 in the SEC and 1–1 in the SEC Tournament.

See also
Tiger Park
LSU Lady Tigers softball
LSU Tigers and Lady Tigers

References

Defunct college softball venues in the United States
Demolished sports venues in Louisiana
LSU Tigers softball venues
Softball venues in Louisiana
1997 establishments in Louisiana
Sports venues completed in 1997
2008 disestablishments in Louisiana
2012 disestablishments in Louisiana
Sports venues demolished in 2012